Rahat Hossain (born December 19, 1989), also known by his username MagicofRahat, is an American YouTube personality, vlogger, and prankster who produces pranks and magic tricks on YouTube. Since creating his YouTube channel, his channel has received over seven million subscribers and over one billion video views. He would get ideas on videos from other youtubers and remake their videos in his own way. Rahat would make his own copy of the original Homeless lotto winner video by Chris Russell. 2 days after copying this video and making his own version rahats channel gained mass following.

Early life 
Hossain's parents are from Bangladesh. He was born and grew up in Virginia Beach, where he showed passion for building things with cardboard and duct tape. Hossain attended Old Dominion University in approximately 2009, majoring in criminal justice . In college, he began uploading videos featuring card tricks. The first video uploaded on his YouTube account was titled "Maxi-Twist by Rahat". He uploaded almost 50 videos of this genre before filming hidden camera pranks. He would be inspired by other youtubers and improve on them, He would upload videos of himself doing something another youtuber had already done before him, but improve the showmanship in his own way.

Career

Driver drive thru pranks
Hossain posted his hit video, "Drive Thru Invisible Man Prank," on January 9, 2013. The video shows him dressed up as a car seat and fooling workers at various fast food restaurants, such as McDonald's and Chick-fil-A. Hossain said he constructed the car-seat outfit in 12 hours after being inspired by an image he found on the Internet of a "guy who'd actually had a car-seat costume similar to what I built".

The prank gained immense popularity and was featured on Fox & Friends, Good Morning America, and The Ellen DeGeneres Show, among others. As of 2014, the video received over 40 million total views.

In June 2014 Toyota featured Hossain in a similar invisible driver stunt in Europe, steering the Toyota Aygo.

Homeless lottery winner "scandal"

Hossain got the idea from another youtuber which uploaded "Homeless Lottery Winner" uploaded on 2nd March 2014, 2 days later hossains version titled the exact same youtube title "Homeless Lottery Winner" was uploaded on the 4th March 2014. Rahat done his version and went viral. Rahat might not have been as popular if he didn't copy the original Lotto win video by Chris Russell, In a video posted on March 4, 2014, Hossain pranked a homeless man named Eric Aursby, where Eric "won" a lottery using a "losing" lottery ticket Hossain gave to him. With the "losing" lottery ticket, Eric "won" $1,000, which was all part of the prank. After receiving the money, Eric tried to give Hossain half of it, which Hossain declined to take. 

In the following weeks, Hossain posted another video in which he said that people (who were touched by Eric wanting to give half of the money to Hossain) asked how they could donate to Eric. Hossain set up a fundraiser, the goal being to collect a total of $20,000. The fundraiser collected more than $44,000 to a final tally of $66,000 from over 3,000 donors. Hossain said that he wanted to "improve his lifestyle" and emphasized Eric's personality. While collecting the money, Eric moved into a hotel room and was given a job at 7-Eleven via a friend. However, Hossain would later reveal that Eric never showed up for his work, telling Hossain that he "didn't feel like it". On May 7, 2014, Hossain uploaded a video to YouTube titled "Homeless Man Gets A Home" The video shows Hossain offering to buy dinner for Eric, but first Hossain says he has to stop by "his" house to get something. At the house, Hossain reveals that the house is not his, and it is actually Eric's. It was also later revealed that the house was paid for by thousands of Internet contributors for Eric. In a matter of days, the video received about 9 million views.

In February 2018, a video was posted containing a new interview of Eric, who claimed that he did not have access to the money and the house needed constant maintenance. He also alleged that he had not received any of the money raised from the fundraiser, he only stayed in the house from Hossain's second video for two months rather than a year and sometime after Eric left, the house was sold for $61,000 ($5,000 less than the amount raised in the fundraiser). Hossain responded on June 5, 2018, in a since-deleted Twitter post stating that the money was transferred to Eric and that he would provide bank statements to prove his innocence.

In June 2018, Eric stated he no longer wanted the money from Hossain and forgave him for his actions. However, in a July 2018 interview, Eric again accused Hossain of keeping most of the money from the fundraiser.

Return to YouTube
On August 3, 2020, a YouTube channel called JayLaw made a documentary about Hossain's "disappearance" from social media and YouTube. In the documentary, he investigates what actually happened to Hossain and the false scandal surrounding him and Eric. He also ended up contacting Trey, Hossain's ex-cameraman, where he confirms Hossain's innocence, as Trey himself was also part of the ''Homeless Lottery Winner'' and "Homeless Man Gets A Home" and confirmed Hossain is still around.

On November 18, 2020, Hossain returned to YouTube, ending his hiatus since the beginning of 2018. Hossain described his side of the story and the personal struggles he faced dealing with the aftermath of the "scandal". Hossain left the question about his return to YouTube unanswered and uncertain, explaining that his personality had completely changed and that he had been diagnosed with depression because of the false scandal. He also proceeded to show all of the evidence of him giving money to Eric, hence showing that Eric had been lying the entire time.

In January 2021, Hossain uploaded a new drive-thru prank video featuring the Star Wars character Grogu, beginning his return to the platform as confirmed by his Twitter and his YouTube channel. Beginning on January 6, 2021, Hossain has continued to post prank videos on YouTube.

Personal life
Hossain started a coffee shop business in Newport News, Virginia, called "Canvas Coffee House", which opened in 2019.

References

1989 births
Living people
American YouTubers
American male comedians
21st-century American comedians
People from Virginia Beach, Virginia
Old Dominion University alumni
American people of Bangladeshi descent